Easy Way Out may refer to:

Music 

 Easy Way Out, a 2012 album by Mariama

Songs 

"Easy Way Out" (Elliott Smith song), 2000
"Easy Way Out", by Gotye from Making Mirrors, 2011
"Easy Way Out", by Charlotte Church from Tissues and Issues (2005)
"Easy Way Out", by the Bossmen, included in the 2008 compilation album A-Square (Of Course): The Story of Michigan's Legendary A-Square Records
 "Easy Way Out", by Sylver from Sacrifice (2009)
 "Easy Way Out", by Low Roar from 0 (2014)
 "Easy Way Out", by Ray Wilson and The Veterans (2015)

Literature 

 The Easy Way Out, a 1992 novel by American author Stephen McCauley
Easy Way Out, a 2016 novel by Australian author Steven Amsterdam

Other uses 

The Easy Way Out, a 2014 French film
A euphemism referring to suicide.

See also 
 No Easy Way Out (disambiguation)